BNP Paribas Bank Polska is a Polish bank, originally founded in 1975 as Bank Gospodarki Żywnościowej (BGŻ). It has been owned by BNP Paribas since 2015, and adopted its brand name in 2019.

History 

The origins of BGŻ should be associated with the Polish Agricultural Bank, which was established in 1919 in Warsaw (from 1921 – the State Agricultural Bank, from 1948 – the Agricultural Bank). The bank's business was to provide medium and small farms with short-term loans, long-term loans in covered bonds for land purchase and investments. In the same year, the financial headquarters for the existing savings and loan unions called Centralna Kasa Spółek Rolniczych in Warsaw was established.

In 1975, the Central Union of SOP and the state Agricultural Bank were merged, resulting in the establishment of the state-cooperative Bank Gospodarki Żywnościowej. The first shareholders of BGŻ were 1,663 associated cooperative banks, which owned 46% of shares, and the State Treasury – 54% of shares.

An important moment in the bank's history was the year 1994, when it was transformed into a joint-stock company. The Minister of Finance, in consultation with the President of the National Bank of Poland, granted the statute of BGŻ SA and appointed the first management board and supervisory board. In the same year, BGŻ started cooperation with the Agency for Restructuring and Modernization of Agriculture. An agreement was signed on the conditions and procedure for granting subsidies to interest on loans granted from the bank's funds for the implementation of economic projects related to the development of agriculture and food economy, covered by industry or regional programs. The BGŻ Brokerage House was the first brokerage house in Poland to obtain in 1994 the permission of the Securities Commission to provide professional advice on trading in securities.

In 1997, a representative office of BGŻ S.A. was established in Moscow, providing the possibility of providing banking services to bank customers on eastern markets.

In 2001, the bank enriched its offer with the possibility of using the electronic banking system. In 2011, Bank BGŻ launched the BGŻOptima platform, offering savings solutions, which was a branch of BGŻ bank. The BGŻOptima platform was used at the end of the first half of the 2014, about 158 thousand users. The average employment for the bank in 2013 amounted to 5,537.94 full-time jobs.

On September 17, 2012, Rabobank increased its share in the share capital of Bank BGŻ to 98.26%. On September 20, 2012, Rabobank announced that it intends to merge BGŻ with Rabobank Polska. On June 18, 2014, both banks merged by transferring all assets of Rabobank Polska to Bank BGŻ. The legal merger of Bank Gospodarki Żywnościowej and BNP Paribas Bank Polska took place on April 30, 2015 by transferring all the assets of BNP Paribas Bank Polska S.A. to Bank BGŻ S.A. After the merger, the bank operated under the name of Bank BGŻ BNP Paribas S.A.

In 2019, the BGŻ brand was finally liquidated and replaced with BNP Paribas Bank Polska.

Presidents 

 Alexander Paklons (2007–2010)
 Frederic Amoudru (2010–2013)
 Józef Wancer (2013–2015)
 Tomasz Bogus (2015–2017)
 Przemysław Gdański (since 2017)

References

External links

 

Banks established in 1975
1975 establishments in Poland
2015 disestablishments in Poland
Companies listed on the Warsaw Stock Exchange